Together Always is the eighth collaborative studio album by Porter Wagoner and Dolly Parton. It was released on September 11, 1972, by RCA Victor.

The album was released as a digital download on January 4, 2019.

Content
The album consists entirely of songs composed by either Parton or Wagoner. It contains their hit "Lost Forever in Your Kiss", in addition to the humorous "Ten Four — Over and Out", which exploited the C.B. radio craze a few years before it became a major phenomenon in the US. "Poor Folks Town" was later recorded as a solo by Parton on her 1980 album, 9 to 5 and Odd Jobs. The album features liner notes written by both Wagoner and Parton in their own handwriting.

Critical reception

The review published in the September 23, 1972 issue of Billboard said, "Two of the most consistent chart winners join forces once again for another top package loaded with programming and sales potency. Duo wrote all the material
with highlights that include "Lost Forever in Your Kiss," "Love's All Over", "Ten Four – Over and Out", and of course the current
hit single, "Together Always"."

Cashbox published a review in the September 9, 1972 issue, which said, "The time is September, 1982, and the scene is an anniversary party. Porter Wagoner and Dolly Parton are celebrating the tenth anniversary of their "Together Always" album; they are celebrating as proof that the album title was accurate and that they would truly remain a team forever. Maybe this fantasy is projecting too far into the future, but if you hear the closeness of Porter and Dolly's music on their new album, then you would not only agree with me, you would make advance reservations for the 1992 anniversary party! Includes "Lost Forever in Your Kiss", "Poor Folks Town", and "Christina"."

Commercial performance
The album peaked at No. 3 on the US Billboard Hot Country LP's chart.

The album's first single, "Lost Forever in Your Kiss", was released in March 1972 and peaked at No. 9 on the US Billboard Hot Country Singles chart. The second single, "Together Always", was released in July 1972 and peaked at No. 14 on the US Billboard Hot Country Singles chart.

Recording
Recording sessions for the album took place on April 28, May 1 and 2, 1972, at RCA Studio B in Nashville, Tennessee. Six of the album's ten tracks were recorded during sessions for 1972's The Right Combination • Burning the Midnight Oil. "Love's All Over", "Take Away" and "You and Me – Her and Him" were recorded on April 7, 1971. "Anyplace You Want to Go", "Looking Down" and "Lost Forever in Your Kiss" were recorded on September 28, 29 and 30, 1971, respectively.

Track listing

Personnel
Adapted from the album liner notes and RCA recording session records.

Joseph Babcock  – backing vocals
Jerry Carrigan – drums
Pete Drake – steel
Bobby Dyson – bass
Dolores Edgin – backing vocals
Johnny Gimble – fiddle
Dave Kirby – guitar
Les Leverett – cover photo
Mack Magaha – fiddle
George McCormick – rhythm guitar
June Evelyn Page – backing vocals
Dolly Parton – lead vocals, liner notes
Tom Pick – recording engineer
Hargus Robbins – piano
Billy Sanford – guitar
Dale Sellers – guitar
Roy Shockley – recording technician
Jerry Shook – guitar
Buddy Spicher – fiddle
Jerry Stembridge – guitar
Robert Thompson – guitar
Buck Trent – electric banjo
Porter Wagoner – lead vocals, liner notes

Charts
Album

Singles

Release history

References

Dolly Parton albums
Porter Wagoner albums
1972 albums
Albums produced by Bob Ferguson (music)
RCA Records albums
Vocal duet albums